The Ogden Intermodal Transit Center is a commuter rail train and bus station in Ogden, Utah, United States. It is served by the FrontRunner, Utah Transit Authority's (UTA) commuter rail train, as well as UTA local and commuter bus service, and Greyhound Lines long-distance bus service.

Description 
The Ogden Intermodal Transit Center is frequently referred to by various names, even by UTA itself, with the Ogden Intermodal Center being the most common alternative. Other names include the Ogden Station, the Ogden Central Station, and the Ogden Transit Center. However, it should not be confused with the Ogden Union Station, which is a train station just south of the Transit Center (which has not had rail service since May 1997).

The Transit Center was built on approximately 15 acres of land and opened in 2002 with UTA bus service only. The FrontRunner construction was later completed to provide commuter rail service.  The FrontRunner train service began in 2008. It is anticipated that if Amtrak (the National Railroad Passenger Corporation) should ever resume passenger rail service to Ogden (particularly the Pioneer) the Transit Center would be used as the stop.

The Transit Center located at 2350 South Wall Avenue (Utah State Route 204). However, even though it is adjacent to 24th Street (Utah State Route 53), Wall Avenue has limited access from 24th Street (2400 South). The Transit Center has a free Park and Ride lot with about 475 parking spaces available. It is located within the Quiet Zone, so trains do not routinely sound their horns when approaching public crossings within this corridor. The station's interior is locked on weekends.

History 
The Transit Center is just across the street from the Ogden Union Station (home to the Utah State Railroad Museum, Browning-Kimball Classic Car Museum and Browning Firearms Museum) as well as Historic 25th Street. Ogden historically, until the early 1970s the station served frequent trains going northwest to Oregon and Washington, and east to Chicago. Within walking distance is the downtown Ogden district, including The Junction and associated attractions: Treehouse Museum, iFly, and Megaplex 13.

The site of the Transit Center is in a railroad yard that has been active since 1869, when the first transcontinental railroad reached the area. Because of its long use as a railroad yard, and the accompanying hazardous waste. it was also a Superfund site. Therefore, as part of the construction, UTA was required to have a groundwater and soil management plan. As a result of the overall efforts in this development of brownfield, UTA and Ogden City received the Phoenix Award from the Phoenix Awards Institute.

FrontRunner 

On weekdays the FrontRunner has about twenty-three round trips between Ogden and Provo (through Salt Lake City) and about five more round trips between Ogden and Downtown Salt Lake City.  On Saturdays there are only nineteen round trips between Ogden and Provo.  Trains run hourly from about 4:30 am to just after midnight on weekdays (with additional half-hour runs for the morning and evening commutes). Saturdays have hourly runs from about 6:00 am to 2:30 am Sunday morning.

Ogden Express 

The Ogden Express is an under construction bus rapid transit line that will connect the Ogden Transit Center with Weber State University and McKay-Dee Hospital. It is anticipated to be competed and begin service in 2023.

References

External links 

 Ogden Intermodal Transit Center Quick Facts
 Official UTA website
 UTA FrontRunner Schedule
  Ogden Intermodal Transit Center photo gallery

Railway stations in the United States opened in 2008
Transit centers in the United States
UTA FrontRunner stations
Transportation in Weber County, Utah
Buildings and structures in Ogden, Utah
2002 establishments in Utah
Railway stations in Weber County, Utah